Łukasz Madej  (born 14 April 1982) is a Polish former professional football who played as a midfielder.

Career 

Madej started his career with ŁKS Łódź.

International career
Madej has made five appearances for the full Poland national football team.

References

External links
 Guardian's Stats Centre
 
 

1982 births
Living people
Polish footballers
Poland international footballers
ŁKS Łódź players
Ruch Chorzów players
Lech Poznań players
Górnik Łęczna players
Associação Académica de Coimbra – O.A.F. players
Śląsk Wrocław players
GKS Bełchatów players
Górnik Zabrze players
Ekstraklasa players
Primeira Liga players
Footballers from Łódź
Association football midfielders
Polish expatriate sportspeople in Portugal